Zutho is a fermented drink, originating from the Indian state of Nagaland, obtained from rice. It is a drink of the Angami and Chakhesang Nagas and is commonly consumed by all Nagas in both urban and rural regions of Nagaland.

It contains approximately 5%(v/v) of ethanol, and is known for its fruity odor, which is partly imparted by the acetyl esters in generous amounts. Traditionally zutho is prepared by allowing starch-rich solutions to broken down by enzymes into sugars that are fermented by yeast. Starch in rice has to be made into malt by sprouting, or digested by enzymes that Nagas learned to grow in a separate process on a plant.

See also
Choujiu–Chinese equivalent of Zutho
Makgeolli—Korean equivalent of Zutho
Nigori–Japanese equivalent of Zutho

Notes and Sources
Y. Teramoto, S. Yoshida and S. Ueda:  of a rice beer (zutho) and a yeast isolated from the fermented product in Nagaland, India, World Journal of Microbiology and Biotechnology, December 2002.

Indian alcoholic drinks
Rice wine
Naga cuisine